Neuronal acetylcholine receptor subunit beta-2 is a protein that in humans is encoded by the CHRNB2 gene.

Neuronal acetylcholine receptors are homo- or heteropentameric complexes composed of homologous alpha and beta subunits. They belong to a superfamily of ligand-gated ion channels which allow the flow of sodium and potassium across the plasma membrane in response to ligands such as acetylcholine and nicotine. This gene encodes one of several beta subunits. Mutations in this gene are associated with autosomal dominant nocturnal frontal lobe epilepsy.

It has been discovered that suppression, rather than stimulation, of B2-containing nAChR currents yields an antidepressant effect.  This is believed to explain the significantly increased prevalence of cigarette smoking in depressed individuals and the profound rise in depressive symptoms during abstinence.

Interactive pathway map

See also
 Nicotinic acetylcholine receptor

References

Further reading

External links 
 
 
 

Ion channels
Nicotinic acetylcholine receptors